KPWB may refer to:

 KPWB (AM), a radio station (1140 AM) licensed to Piedmont, Missouri, United States
 KPWB-FM, a radio station (104.9 FM) licensed to Piedmont, Missouri, United States
 KCWI-TV, a television station (channel 23) licensed to Ames, Iowa, United States, which used the call sign KPWB-TV from June 1998 to September 2006
 KMAX-TV, a television station (channel 31) licensed to Sacramento, California, United States, which used the call sign KPWB-TV while affiliated with The WB Television Network from 1995 to 1998.